Len Duncan (July 25, 1911 Brooklyn, New York – August 1, 1998 Lansdale, Pennsylvania) was an American race car driver. Duncan raced midget cars in seven decades from 1920s until the 1980s. During World War II, received the honor of being assigned as President Harry S. Truman's driver during one of his visits to England. Mario Andretti credits Duncan with having a great influence on his professional life. Andretti raced against Duncan in the American Racing Drivers Club (ARDC) series in 1963.

Midget car career
Duncan began racing in 1928. Duncan was the AAA Eastern Midget Champion. Duncan won eight American Racing Drivers Club (ARDC) championships during the thirteen years between 1955 and 1967.

Career award
He was inducted in the National Midget Auto Racing Hall of Fame in 1991.

Indy 500 results

Complete Formula One World Championship results
(key)

 * Indicates shared drive with George Fonder

References

1911 births
1998 deaths
Indianapolis 500 drivers
Racing drivers from New York City
Sportspeople from Brooklyn